Thomas Edwardes may refer to:

Sir Thomas Edwardes, 1st Baronet (1599-1660), of the Edwardes baronets
Sir Thomas Edwardes, 6th Baronet (1730–1790), of the Edwardes baronets
Sir Thomas Edwardes, 7th Baronet (1727–1797), of the Edwardes baronets

See also
Thomas Edwards (disambiguation)
Edwardes (surname)